Darvishan (also Romanized as Darvīshān; also known as Darreh Shān) is a village in Zhavarud-e Sharqi Rural District, in the Central District of Sanandaj County, Kurdistan Province, Iran. At the 2006 census, its population was 262, in 65 families. The village is populated by Kurds.

References 

Towns and villages in Sanandaj County
Kurdish settlements in Kurdistan Province